Greg Kaplan is professor of economics at the University of Chicago. His research encompasses macroeconomics, labor economics and applied microeconomics, with a focus on distributional issues.

Education and Career 
Greg Kaplan graduated with a BCom from Macquarie University in 2000. He went on to further study at the London School of Economics and received an MSc in economics in 2002. He got a PhD from New York University in 2009. Following his graduation with a PhD from New York University in 2009, worked at the Federal Reserve Bank of Minneapolis for a year. He then became assistant professor at the University of Pennsylvania. He left Philadelphia for an assistant professorship at Princeton University in 2012 and was promoted to full professor in 2015. The University of Chicago appointed him professor in economics in 2016.

Research

Household finance 
In a 2014 paper with Gianluca Violante and Justin Weidner, Kaplan shows that a sizable share of households own little liquid wealth despite holding significant illiquid wealth. The authors call such households "wealthy hand-to-mouth". Because the wealthy hand-to-mouth have little liquid wealth they react strongly to transitory income shocks and therefore have high MPCs. This has important implications for fiscal and monetary policy (see HANK models). Kaplan further shows with Gianluca Violante that models featuring wealthy hand-to-mouth (i.e. with one liquid asset and one illiquid asset) yield aggregate responses to fiscal shocks one order of magnitude higher than standard one-asset models, consistent with empirical evidence.

Heterogeneous Agent New Keynesian models 
In 2018, Kaplan together with Benjamin Moll and Gianluca Violante introduce the term HANK (Heterogeneous Agent New Keynesian) model to describe the rising literature incorporating household heterogeneity into New-Keynesian models. They argue that monetary policy operates mostly via general equilibrium effects on the labor market, instead of the standard intertemporal substitution channel. This is due to a sizable share of households exhibiting high MPCs, whose spending behavior reacts strongly to changes in disposable income. As Ricardian equivalence fails in HANK models, the reaction of the fiscal authority to a monetary shock is key to determine the overall macroeconomic response.

Other activities 
Kaplan is an editor of the Journal of Political Economy, a research associate at the National Bureau of Economic Research and a research fellow at the Institute for Fiscal Studies. He is also an economic consultant at the Federal Reserve Bank of Chicago.

In 2015 he received a Sloan Foundation fellowship. The Econometric Society elected him fellow in 2020.

Selected works 

Bond, Steve; Hashemi, Arshia; Kaplan, Greg; Zoch, Piotr. (2021). "Some unpleasant markup arithmetic: Production function elasticities and their estimation from production data. Journal of Monetary Economics". Journal of Monetary Economics. 121:1-14.

References

External links 

 Official website
 Profile on the University of Chicago's website

Date of birth missing (living people)
Australian economists
Macroeconomists
Macquarie University alumni
Alumni of the London School of Economics
New York University alumni
University of Pennsylvania faculty
Princeton University faculty
University of Chicago faculty
Sloan Fellows
Fellows of the Econometric Society
Year of birth missing (living people)
Living people
Journal of Political Economy editors